Valmiera Drama Theatre is a theatre in Valmiera, Latvia. It was established in 1919. Asja Lācis was director from 1950 to 1957.

References

External links
Official site

Theatres in Latvia
1919 establishments in Latvia
Valmiera